The Atlantic Branch is an electrified rail line owned and operated by the Long Island Rail Road in the U.S. state of New York. It is the only LIRR line with revenue passenger service in the borough of Brooklyn.

The line consists of two sections constructed separately. The portion of the line from Atlantic Terminal to Jamaica was constructed as part of the Brooklyn and Jamaica Railroad and opened in 1836, while the portion from Jamaica to Valley Stream was constructed as part of the South Side Railroad of Long Island in 1867.

Description
Partly underground and partly elevated, the Atlantic Branch runs from Atlantic Terminal in Downtown Brooklyn to Valley Stream, in Nassau County, where it becomes the two-track Long Beach Branch with the two-track Far Rockaway Branch splitting southward just east of the Valley Stream station.

The section between Atlantic Terminal and Bedford Avenue is underground along Atlantic Avenue. From there the line is elevated above the median of Atlantic Avenue to Dewey Place (with a stop at Nostrand Avenue) before returning underground. At East New York the line rises to street level to cross above the north-south, freight only Bay Ridge Branch, then descends once more to Jamaica. Between East New York and Jamaica, the intact but closed station at Woodhaven Junction is visible.

At 121st Street in Richmond Hill, Queens, the line rises to street level and passes the Morris Park Facility before joining the elevated Main Line at Jamaica. Immediately east of Jamaica, the line turns southeast, ducking beneath the eastward Main Line tracks. It curves parallel to the Montauk Branch after a few miles and continues next to it to Valley Interlocking in Valley Stream.

History

The current Atlantic Branch is the successor to two separate lines: the Brooklyn and Jamaica Railroad (opened 1836) along Atlantic Avenue from Flatbush Avenue to Jamaica, and the South Side Railroad of Long Island (opened 1867) from Jamaica to Valley Stream.

Atlantic Terminal to Jamaica

The Brooklyn and Jamaica Railroad opened the line from South Ferry to what is now 151st Street in Jamaica on April 18, 1836.

Initially the line turned halfway between Classon and Franklin Avenues, running halfway between Herkimer Street and Schuyler Street (now Atlantic Avenue) along the line of the present Herkimer Place. It turned slightly to the southeast near Howard Avenue, crossing the centerline of Schuyler Street about one-third of the way between Hopkinson Avenue (Thomas Boyland Street) and Paca Avenue (Rockaway Avenue). It crossed into the town of New Lots just beyond Stone Avenue (Mother Gaston Boulevard).

The Atlantic Branch was one of the first lines in the LIRR system slated to be electrified. In anticipation of this the entire line to Jamaica was to be grade separated. Between 1903 and 1905 the line was depressed into a tunnel from Flatbush Avenue to Bedford Avenue, then placed on an elevated viaduct from Bedford Avenue to Ralph Avenue then depressed back into a tunnel until Manhattan Crossing located just west of East New York station. At East New York the line returned to grade level then rose onto another elevated viaduct until Atkins Ave. The rest of the line from Atkins Ave to Morris Park located just west of Jamaica remained at grade level along Atlantic Avenue with numerous grade crossings with the anticipation of grade separating the line later on. Additionally a new terminal and yard was built at Flatbush and Atlantic Avenues. Electric service commenced in 1905 with the line consisting of two tracks between Flatbush Avenue and Woodhaven Junction and four tracks beyond that point to Jamaica.

LIRR then ran two services along the line: the traditional commuter type services from points on eastern Long Island to Flatbush Avenue, along with what was called the "local" rapid transit type service, frequent elevated/subway like service at lower fare between Flatbush Ave and Queens Village (although referred to as a rapid transit type service, standard LIRR cars were used, and the service was operated by railroad rules, as opposed to rapid transit). At this time the line from Jamaica to East New York had many more stations along Atlantic Avenue spaced at closer intervals, much like an elevated/subway rapid transit line. The four tracks between Jamaica and Woodhaven Junction lent itself to this service with rapid transit trains using the outer two tracks while commuter trains used the inner two tracks.

In November 1925, 25 "local" trains left Brooklyn each weekday for Queens Village, 12 more ran to Hillside, and 16 more ran to Jamaica. All trains made all stops, 15 of them west of Queens Village. Fare was probably 10 cents for 13 miles Queens Village to Brooklyn, compared to about 40 cents on "express" LIRR trains making six or seven stops (but a monthly ticket good on any train was $7.10).

For a while the LIRR operated joint service along the Atlantic Branch with the Brooklyn Rapid Transit company (BRT) consisting of two connections, one with the Fifth Ave El at Flatbush Avenue, and another with the Broadway and Lexington Avenue els with a connection built at Chestnut Street in Brooklyn. This allowed BRT trains to access the Rockaways and Manhattan Beach, while affording the LIRR a connection into Manhattan to the BRT terminal located at Park Row over the Brooklyn Bridge (this service predated the opening of the East River Tunnels to Penn Station). Nevertheless the Interstate Commerce Commission ended this service in 1916 when they classified different operating standards between rapid transit trains and regular heavy rail railroads which the LIRR was classified as.

By the late 1930s it was clear that the rest of the line needed to be grade separated. Much of the surrounding area along Atlantic Avenue in Ozone Park and Richmond Hill began their suburban development leading to more traffic along Atlantic Avenue which was plagued by the lines many grade crossings. The City of New York along with the LIRR thus allocated the funds to depress the rest of the line from Morris Park to East New York in a tunnel. Building of the tunnel commenced in 1939 (although plans to build the tunnel date back to 1893) with two of the line's four tracks being pulled out of service and the rapid transit service being discontinued.

On December 28, 1942, the tunnel was completed and opened with the two remaining at-grade tracks pulled out of service. Around this time Atlantic Avenue was raised over the East New York station via a viaduct that separated the road and the railroad. The elevated trestle from East New York to Atkins Avenue was also demolished as it had been included in the new tunnel to Jamaica. Only one station was included in the new tunnel: Woodhaven Junction, where the Atlantic Branch crossed under the Rockaway Beach Branch. An interlocking and track connection was built just west of the Woodhaven Junction station to connect the two lines, but these closed after the abandonment of the Rockaway Beach Branch between 1955 and 1962.

Jamaica to Valley Stream

The portion east of Jamaica was opened by the South Side Railroad of Long Island on October 28, 1867, as part of its initial line from Jamaica to Babylon. With the consolidation of the South Side into the Long Island Rail Road system in 1876, all passenger trains were rerouted to use the LIRR main line from Berlin Junction (west of Jamaica) to Rockaway Junction and the LIRR's Rockaway Branch to Springfield Junction, where it crossed the South Side. This change took effect June 25, 1876, and resulted in the closure of the South Side's Berlin, Beaver Street (Jamaica), Locust Avenue, and Springfield stations. This formed the current configuration, where the Montauk Branch follows this route, mostly ex-South Side, and the Atlantic Branch (then the Old Southern Road) uses the old South Side to Springfield Junction.

The line was soon reopened due to a lawsuit, but closed again by Austin Corbin as of January 6, 1881.

Effective May 17, 1906, when an electrified third track opened alongside the Montauk Division from Springfield Junction to Valley Stream, the Old Southern Road and this new track became part of the Atlantic Division.

Grade-crossing elimination work between Laurelton and Jamaica began in May 1958.

Stations

, the Atlantic Terminal, Nostrand Avenue, and East New York stations are primarily served by a shuttle running between Atlantic Terminal and Jamaica. These stations are also served by trains on the West Hempstead Branch, as well as a limited number of weekday trains on the Hempstead and Babylon branches.

See also
 Lower Manhattan-Jamaica/JFK Transportation Project - A defunct proposal to use the LIRR Atlantic Branch in a new direct JFK connection to Lower Manhattan

References

External links

 1884 and 1900 Maps of the Atlantic Branch and Vicinity (Arrt's Arrchives)

Long Island Rail Road branches
Transportation in Brooklyn
Transportation in Queens, New York
Transportation in Nassau County, New York
Standard gauge railways in the United States
Railway lines opened in 1836